is a Japanese female idol group, managed by Arc Jewel.

Members

Former members

Discography

Albums

Singles

Footnotes

References

External links 
 
 

Japanese girl groups
Japanese idol groups
Japanese pop music groups
Musical groups established in 2011
2011 establishments in Japan

Musical groups from Tokyo